Warrenpoint is a small port town and civil parish in County Down, Northern Ireland. It sits at the head of Carlingford Lough, south of Newry, and is separated from the Republic of Ireland by a narrow strait. The town is beside the village of Rostrevor and is overlooked by the Mournes and Cooley Mountains. Warrenpoint sprang up within the townland of Ringmackilroy, and is locally nicknamed "The Point".

Warrenpoint is known for its scenic location, the Maiden of Mourne festival, the Blues on the Bay music festival, the passenger ferry service between Warrenpoint and Omeath and the nearby Narrow Water Castle. Warrenpoint Port is second in terms of tonnage handled by ports in Northern Ireland. It had a population of 8,732 at the 2011 Census.

History 

The area of Warrenpoint was formerly known as Rinn Mhic Giolla Ruaidh ("McIlroy's point"), anglicised Ringmackilroy, which is still the name of the townland in which it sits. Earlier, it was also known as Portyneil, which may come from Port Uí Néill ("O'Neill's port") or Port an Aoil ("port of the lime").

The earliest reference to the settlement of Warrenpoint is in 1744. It is believed to come from the English surname Waring. It is reported that By 1750 there were only two houses in the village, "with a few huts for the occasional residence of the fishermen during the oyster season". In the following fifty years, however, its scenic beauty and coastal location seem to have hastened its swift growth and by 1837 it had 462 houses.

Fairs were held once a month and a market every Friday. In the mid-19th century, Newry merchants obtained a government grant to create a tidal dock at the village, as prior to 1850 ships of above 150 tonnes could not get further up the lough than Narrow Water.

A railway connection opened on 9 May 1849, increasing Warrenpoint's popularity as a holiday destination. and Warrenpoint became popular as a resort town. Thousands flocked to the resort every year, where most took the passenger ferry to Omeath in County Louth. The Warrenpoint railway station closed in January 1965. The Ferry remains in operation but only in the summer months from May to September.

A bandstand in the town park provided concerts and a saltwater swimming pool was built in 1908. The baths were opened by Captain Roger Hall on Whit Monday, 8 June in that year, but they are now closed to the public.

On 6 February 1921, during the Irish War of Independence, the Irish Republican Army ambushed an Ulster Special Constabulary (USC) patrol in Warrenpoint. The ambush took place on Seaview Road and one USC constable was killed.

During World War II, on 15 July 1944 two Royal Air Force aircraft (an Airspeed Oxford (LX 598) and a Miles Martinet (MS626) from No. 290 Squadron RAF) were taking part in a civil defence demonstration at Warrenpoint. In misty conditions the planes collided, the pilots only having seen each other at the last minute. The resultant explosion killed all on board, and pieces of the planes fell onto Church Street, Duke Street and Queen Street and into Carlingford Lough. The bodies of the airmen were recovered and taken to the mortuary in Newry.

On 27 August 1979, during "the Troubles", the Provisional Irish Republican Army (IRA) ambushed a British Army convoy at nearby Narrow Water Castle. Eighteen soldiers were killed in what became known as the Warrenpoint ambush – the British Army's greatest loss-of-life in a single incident during the conflict.

On 12 April 1989, Joanne Reilly was killed by the IRA in a van bomb attack on Warrenpoint Royal Ulster Constabulary base. Inadequate warning was given.

Places of interest 
Today a small but modern passenger ferry service operates out of Warrenpoint to the village of Omeath in County Louth. The trip takes about fifteen minutes. Other cruises include trips to Narrow Water Castle, Ross Monument  in the neighbouring town Rostrevor and Bay & Harbour Cruises.

Two small inland lakes, the "Mill Dam" and the "Waterworks" offer a variety of fishing opportunities. A permit is needed to fish these lakes, which are located about 1 mile from the town centre.

Warrenpoint Promenade was used as a backdrop for Bundoran in the film The Butcher Boy, especially the exterior of the Star of the Sea Convent and the Edwardian swimming baths.

The Bridal Loanan is one of the biggest cul-de-sac's in the world and the largest in Europe. It also has the Magennis Investiture Stone at its peak.

Education 
St Dallan's Primary School, a Catholic primary school of about 700 pupils, was opened in September 2000 by the then Education Minister Martin McGuinness. Formed from the merger of the Star of the Sea and St. Peters Primary Schools, it was built on the site of the former St. Peters Primary School.

Other schools in the area include Dromore Road Primary School and St Mark's High School.

Demography
On Census Day (27 March 2011) the usually resident population of Warrenpoint/Burren was 8,732 accounting for 0.48% of the NI total. Of these:
 99.19% were from the white (including Irish Traveller) ethnic group
 87.72% belong to or were brought up Catholic and 9.57% belong to or were brought up in a 'Protestant and other (non-Catholic) Christian (including Christian related)' 
 13.80% indicated that they had a British national identity, 56.33% had an Irish national identity and 29.74% had a Northern Irish national identity.

Notable residents
 George Gardiner (1821-1891) - recipient of the Victoria Cross
 Thomas Caulfield Irwin (1823-1892) - poet, writer, and classical scholar; born in Warrenpoint
 Forrest Reid (1875-1947) - writer and literary critic; died in Warrenpoint
 Denis Donoghue (1928-2021) - literary critic; brought up in Warrenpoint
 Carmel Hanna (born 1946) - Social Democratic and Labour Party politician
 Clodagh Rodgers (born 1947) - singer; born in Warrenpoint
 Vedran Smailović (born 1956) - Bosnian cellist, lives in Warrenpoint
 Cathal McCabe (born 1963) - poet; grew up in Warrenpoint

Civil parish of Warrenpoint
The civil parish contains the town of Warrenpoint.
The civil parish contains the following townlands: Dromore, Narrow Water, Ringmackilroy.

See also 
List of localities in Northern Ireland by population
List of civil parishes of County Down
Warrenpoint GAA
Warrenpoint and Rostrevor Tramway
Warrenpoint Town F.C.

References

External links 

 
 Warrenpoint area photos and stories from the past and present
 Warrenpoint Harbour
 Warrenpoint Local Tourism Website

 
Towns in County Down
Ports and harbours of Northern Ireland
Port cities and towns in Northern Ireland
Aviation accidents and incidents locations in Northern Ireland